Aleksei Yuryevich Yepifanov (born 21 July 1983) is a former Russian professional footballer. He made his debut in the Russian Premier League in 2002 for FC Rotor Volgograd.

References

External links

1983 births
Living people
Russian footballers
FC Rotor Volgograd players
FC Ural Yekaterinburg players
FC Kuban Krasnodar players
FC Baltika Kaliningrad players
FC Zvezda Irkutsk players
FC Sodovik Sterlitamak players
FC SKA-Khabarovsk players
FC Torpedo Moscow players
FK Atlantas players
JK Sillamäe Kalev players
Russian Premier League players
A Lyga players
Meistriliiga players
Russian expatriate footballers
Russian expatriate sportspeople in Lithuania
Expatriate footballers in Lithuania
Russian expatriate sportspeople in Estonia
Expatriate footballers in Estonia
Association football defenders
FC Amkar Perm players
FC Avangard Kursk players
FC Sever Murmansk players